"Free Me" is a song by Sia, released on 9 June 2017. Proceeds from the song support efforts to eliminate HIV/AIDS.

Composition 
"Free Me" is a piano-led ballad laden with orchestral compositions. It was written by Sia and Oliver Kraus in the key of E-flat major.

Music video
The music video for "Free Me", directed by Blake Martin, was released alongside the song on 9 June 2017. Zoe Saldana plays an expectant mother who goes for a check-up only to find out that she is HIV-positive. In a voiceover provided by Julianne Moore, we find out that Saldana could pass the disease on to her unborn child if she goes untreated. The five-minute clip follows the mum-to-be's journey from learning of her health status to building her emotional strength–as illustrated by a heartfelt dance sequence choreographed by Ryan Heffington–and giving birth to a healthy baby.

Credits 
Music video credits adapted from YouTube.

 Blake Martin – director
 Kimberly Stuckwisch – producer
 Ian Blair – producer, executive producer
 Diktator – production company
 Ryan Heffington – choreographer
 Marshall Rose – director of photography
 Javier Ameijeiras – production designer
 Josh Strickland – art director
 Madia Hill Scott – production supervisor
 Kelli Kay – assistant production supervisor
 Chad Nicholson – first assistant director
 Bruno Michaels – second assistant director
 Ari Robbins – steadicam

Charts

References

2017 singles
2017 songs
Charity singles
HIV/AIDS
Sia (musician) songs
Songs written by Sia (musician)